Acceleration is a 2019 American action film directed by Michael Merino and Daniel Zirilli. The film stars Sean Patrick Flanery, with a supporting cast of Dolph Lundgren, Chuck Liddell, Danny Trejo, Quinton "Rampage" Jackson and Natalie Burn, who also producer.

Plot
Vladik Zorich, a crime lord whose tentacles permeate the underbelly of a seedy Los Angeles as he deals in guns, gambling, drugs and skin trafficking, finds himself double-crossed by his most trusted operative Rhona Zyocki. Vladik's propensity for power, control, and violence drives him to kidnap Rhona's young son, forcing Rhona to participate in a planned elimination of Vladik's enemies and identities. As her son's life hangs in the balance, Rhona struggles to find and kill Vladik's most violent and twisted foes and regain valuable goods and information, all in one fateful night. To keep her on a short leash, Vladik sets out the 'rules' to his 'game' and overseas Rhona's every move as she navigates the darkened streets of Los Angeles. However, Vladik underestimates the power of a mother's love, and finds himself losing control as his devious plan slowly unravels.

Cast

 Sean Patrick Flanery as Kane 
 Dolph Lundgren as Vladik Zorich
 Chuck Liddell as Hannibal 
 Natalie Burn as Rhona Zyocki
 Quinton "Rampage" Jackson as Eli
 Danny Trejo as Santos
 Ian Fisher as Chiko
 Dobromir Mashukov as Mika
 Luka Tartaglia as Antoine

Release

Theatrical
Acceleration was released in the United States on November 8, 2019.

Reception

Critical response
The film has received mostly negative reviews from critics, with Frank Scheck of The Hollywood Reporter, Noel Murray of the Los Angeles Times, and Richard Whittaker of The Austin Chronicle all criticizing the film's poor plot.

References

External links

2019 films
2019 action films
2010s chase films
2010s vigilante films
2010s road movies
American films about revenge
American action films
American chase films
American vigilante films
American road movies
CineTel Films films
Films about drugs
Films set in California
Films set in Los Angeles
Girls with guns films
2010s English-language films
Films directed by Daniel Zirilli
2010s American films